Obra Completa (Portuguese for "Complete Works") is a compilation album by Brazilian rock band Zero, released in 2003 by EMI in order to celebrate the band's 20th anniversary. It is a combination of their EP Passos no Escuro and their first (and, at the time of the compilation's release, only) studio album Carne Humana, completely remastered, in one CD. The compilation is currently out of print.

The album's cover is an homage to Norman Rockwell's 1962 painting The Connoisseur.

Track listing

Personnel
 Guilherme Isnard – vocals, alto sax (on tracks 1, 2 and 4)
 Eduardo Amarante – guitar
 Alfred "Freddy" Haiat – keyboards
 Ricardo "Rick" Villas-Boas – bass
 Athos Costa – drums (on tracks 1–6)
 Malcolm Oakley – drums (on tracks 7–16)
 Paulo Ricardo – backing vocals (on track 2)

References

External links
 Obra Completa at Discogs

2003 compilation albums
Zero (Brazilian band) albums
EMI Records compilation albums